Elizabeth Duane Gillespie Junior High School is a historic junior high school building located in the Nicetown–Tioga neighborhood of Philadelphia, Pennsylvania.  It was designed by Irwin T. Catharine and built in 1925–1927.  It is a four-story, 17 bay, brick building on a raised basement in the Late Gothic Revival-style.  It features projecting end pavilions, arched openings, and a large stone Gothic entryway.  It was named for president of the Colonial Dames of Pennsylvania and Flag Day founder Elizabeth Duane Gillespie.

It was added to the National Register of Historic Places in 1989. The building is now vacant, although it is immediately south of the still-occupied Simon Gratz High School.

References

School buildings on the National Register of Historic Places in Philadelphia
Gothic Revival architecture in Pennsylvania
School buildings completed in 1927
Nicetown-Tioga, Philadelphia
1927 establishments in Pennsylvania